C. nana may refer to:
 Caladenia nana, Endl. in J.G.C.Lehmann, 1846, the dwarf Caladenia, an orchid species in the genus Caladenia
 Cardiocondyla nana, an ant species in the genus Cardiocondyla
 Castilleja nana, the dwarf alpine Indian paintbrush, a plant species native to the western United States
 Cavia nana, a Guinea pig species in the genus Cavia
 Ceroxys nana, a picture-winged fly species
 Chaeteessa nana, a praying mantis species
 Chanda nana, the elongate glassy perchlet, a fish species
 Chusquea nana, a bamboo species in the genus Chusquea
 Clarkella nana, a plant species
 Cochylis nana, a moth species found in Europe, Amur Oblast and Nova Scotia
 Corallicola nana, a fungus species
 Crepis nana, the dwarf alpine hawksbeard, a flowering plant species native to much of northern North America and northern Asia
 Crocidura nana, the Somali dwarf shrew, a mammal species found in Ethiopia and Somalia
 Cryosophila nana, a flowering plant species found only in Mexico
 Cryphia nana, a moth species found in California
 Cyanolyca nana, the dwarf jay, a bird species endemic to Mexico
 Cylindromyia nana, a fly species in the genus Cylindromyia

synonyms
 Calliphora nana, a synonym for Calliphora vicina, a fly species

See also
 Nana (disambiguation)